Black Creek is a stream in St. Louis County, in the U.S. state of Minnesota.

Black Creek was named from the fact peat darkens its waters.

See also
List of rivers of Minnesota

References

Rivers of St. Louis County, Minnesota
Rivers of Minnesota